Gråå BK is a Swedish volleyball club located in Gothenburg and was formed in 1976. It consists of a women's and a men's team playing in the third Swedish division.

External links
Gråå BK - Volleyball Gothenburg 

Sports clubs in Gothenburg
Swedish volleyball clubs
1976 establishments in Sweden
Volleyball clubs established in 1976